Charles H. Swasey (June 21, 1839-October 4, 1862) was an officer in the United States Navy who was killed in action during the American Civil War.

Biography
Born in Massachusetts, Swasey was appointed midshipman on 28 September 1854, and commissioned lieutenant on 31 August 1861. Lieutenant Swasey was wounded during an engagement with Confederate forces near Donaldsonville, Louisiana, on 4 October 1862, and died the same day.

He is buried at Mount Pleasant Cemetery in Taunton, Massachusetts.

Namesakes
Two ships have been named  in his honor.

See also

Mount Pleasant Cemetery (Taunton, Massachusetts)

References
 

1839 births
1862 deaths
United States Navy officers
Union Navy officers
People from Taunton, Massachusetts
People of Massachusetts in the American Civil War
Union military personnel killed in the American Civil War
Burials at Mount Pleasant Cemetery (Taunton, Massachusetts)